Parracombe is a rural settlement  south-west of Lynton, in Devon, England. It is situated in the Heddon Valley, on Exmoor. The population at the 2011 census was 293.

A number Bronze Age barrows exist nearby, along with several other small earth-works throughout the parish. Beacon Castle and Voley Castle both Iron Age Hill forts are situated nearby. Rowley Barton ("rough clearing") was a manor mentioned in the Domesday Book along with East and West Middleton.

Holwell Castle, at Parracombe was a Norman motte and bailey castle built to guard the junction of the east–west and north–south trade routes, enabling movement of people and goods and the growth of the population. Alternative explanations for its construction suggest it may have been constructed to obtain taxes at the River Heddon bridging place, or to protect and supervise silver mining in the area around Combe Martin. It was built in the late 11th or early 12th century.

Parracombe's St Petrock's Church is now in the care of the Churches Conservation Trust.

Until 1935 the village was served by a halt on the Lynton & Barnstaple Railway which ran close to the centre of the settlement.

References

External links 

Exmoor
Villages in Devon